Frederick Brown (6 December 1931 – November 2013) was an English professional footballer who made 135 appearances in the Football League playing as a goalkeeper for Aldershot, West Bromwich Albion and Portsmouth. He also played non-league football for Leytonstone, Poole Town, Tunbridge Wells United, Chertsey Town and Horsham YMCA.

Brown was born in 1931 in Leyton, which was then in Essex, and died in Surrey in 2013 at the age of 81.

References

1931 births
2013 deaths
People from Leyton
English footballers
Association football goalkeepers
Leytonstone F.C. players
Aldershot F.C. players
West Bromwich Albion F.C. players
Portsmouth F.C. players
Poole Town F.C. players
Tunbridge Wells F.C. players
Chertsey Town F.C. players
Horsham YMCA F.C. players
English Football League players